The R567 is a Regional Route in South Africa.

Route
Its northwestern origin is from the N11 approximately 60 kilometres north of Mokopane. It runs southeast to Polokwane, ending at an intersection with the R521.

Prominent Areas 
 Sešego Cross, the intersection with the N11 road.
 Tibane Cross, the intersection with the Matlala Road.
 Moletši Cross, the intersection with the Moletši Road. 
 Sešego.

References

Regional Routes in Limpopo